Das Supertalent season 1 is the first season of Germany's version of the Got Talent Franchise. Season 1 was presented by Marco Schreyl and the judges were Dieter Bohlen, Ruth Moschner and André Sarrasani. The auditions took place in Cologne, Hamburg, Oldenburg and Munich and approximately 5000 people applied for the three-part show. The auditions took place in the first two programs on 20 October and 27 October 2007, in the Schiller Theater in Berlin.  The show reached up to 6.72 million in audience figures. On 3 November, 19-year-old opera singer Ricardo Marinello won in the final by singing and won 100,000 euros.

Das Supertalent
RTL (German TV channel) original programming
2007 German television seasons